Anesti Stoja (born 24 June 1963) is a retired Albanian football midfielder.

International career
He made his debut for Albania in an October 1988 FIFA World Cup qualification match away against Poland, coming on as a second-half substitute for Ylli Shehu. It proved to be his sole international game.

Honours
Albanian Superliga: 4
 1985, 1988, 1989, 1995

References

External links

1963 births
Living people
Association football midfielders
Albanian footballers
Albania international footballers
KF Tirana players
Kategoria Superiore players